is a Japanese actress, voice actress and narrator.

Career
In 1981, she made her voice actor debut as Flore in Six God Combination Godmars.

She also narrates many news programs, especially as a main narrator for TV Asahi News Station for over 10 years.

She herself calls her occupation "Voice Actor". In performing the role, she is always aspiring to perform delicate and full of human performance based on detailed settings, backgrounds and habits.

She has been interested in theatrical performance since elementary school, and after gaining experience in the theater club in the middle and high school era, she majored in the theater department. When receiving various theater companies, the voice actors set up a new office and participated in an invitation from a person who was the husband and teacher of Mari Shimizu, the participant of the launch performance. The president of the office and the elderly also invited her to be voice actors.

Filmography

Anime
1980s
 1981 Six God Combination Godmars – Flore
 1981 Urusei Yatsura – Otama
 1982 Space Cobra – Armaroid Lady
 1983 Cat's Eye – Mitsuko Asatani
 1983 Mirai Keisatsu Urashiman – Josephine Catsburg
 1984 God Mazinger – Aira
 1984 Yoroshiku Mechadock – Asami
 1984 Elves of the Forest – ???
 1985 Dancouga – Super Beast Machine God – Reimi
 1985 Mobile Suit Zeta Gundam – Haman Karn, Mouar Pharaoh
 1986 Maison Ikkoku – Ayako
 1986 Mobile Suit Gundam ZZ – Haman Karn
 1987 Kimagure Orange Road – Madoka's mother
 1987 Mami the Psychic – Mama
 1988 City Hunter 2 – Tachiki Sayuri
 1988 Go! Anpanman – Tekka no Makichan
 1989 Idol Densetsu Eriko – Ryoko Asagiri
 1989 Blue Blink – ???
 1989 The Adventures of Hutch the Honeybee – Mama
 1989 Patlabor: The TV Series – Shinobu Nagumo
1990s
 1990 Idol Angel Yokoso Yoko – Keiko Matsushima
 1994 Blue Seed – Azusa Matsudaira
 1995 Sailor Moon SuperS – Queen Nehelenia
 1995 Fushigi Yûgi: The Mysterious Play – Shouka
 1996 Kodocha – Michelle
 1996 Sailor Moon Sailor Stars – Queen Nehelenia
 1996 You're Under Arrest – Kaoruko Kinoshita
 1996 The Vision of Escaflowne – Varie
 1997 Clamp School Detectives – Casablanca
 1997 Don't Leave Me Alone, Daisy – Mother
 1998 Princess Nine – Keiko Himuro
 1998 Fancy Lala – Mamiko Shinohara
2000s
 2001 Hellsing – Sir Integra
 2001 PaRappa the Rapper – Hairdresser Octopus Ep.27
 2002 Tenchi Muyo! GXP – Misaki Masaki Jurai
 2003 Chrono Crusade – Kate Valentine
 2004 Sgt. Frog – Oka Nishizawa
 2004 Ghost in the Shell: Stand Alone Complex 2nd GIG – Yoko Kayabuki
 2005 Moeyo Ken – Oryou
 2005 Tide-Line Blue – Aoi
 2009 Inuyasha: The Final Act – Sesshōmaru's Mother
 2009 Kiddy Girl-and – Arnice
2010s
 2010 Cobra The Animation – Armaroid Lady
 2010 Highschool of the Dead – Yuriko Takagi
 2011 Nichijou – Oil in episode 15
 2012 From the New World – Tomiko Asahina
 2012 Saint Seiya Omega – Medea
 2012 Psycho-Pass – Joshu Kasei
 2014 Riddle Story of Devil – Yuri Meichi
 2014 Bonjour♪Sweet Love Patisserie – Nadeshiko Minagawa
 2015 Kantai Collection – Narrator, Hikōjō Ki, Chūkan Seiki
 2015 Yona of the Dawn – Gigan
 2015 Go! Princess PreCure – Dyspear
 2015 Gangsta – Gina Paulklee
 2016 The Great Passage – Kaoru Sasaki
 2017 Grimoire of Zero – Sorena
2020s
 2020 Akudama Drive – Boss
 2021 Yashahime: Princess Half-Demon – Sesshōmaru's Mother
 2021 Yasuke – Yami no Daimyо̄
 2021 Blade Runner: Black Lotus – Josephine Grant
 2023 The Fire Hunter – Narrator

OVA
 1983 Dallos – Melinda Hurst
 1985 Greed – Mimau
 1985 Area 88 – Yasuda
 1985 Cream Lemon – Rio
 1985 Vampire Hunter D – Younger Snake Sister
 1985 The Karuizawa Syndrome – Kaoru Matsunuma
 1986 The Humanoid – Antoinette
 1986 Megazone 23 Part II – Reina
 1987 Black Magic M-66 – Sybil
 1987 Bubblegum Crisis – Sylia Stingray
 1987 Devilman: The Birth – Sirene
 1987 Kaze to Ki no Uta Sanctus: Sei Naru Kana – Rosemarine 1987 God Bless Dancouga – Remi Shikishima
 1988 Mobile Police Patlabor – Shinobu Nagumo
 1988 Mobile Suit SD Gundam – Haman Karn
 1988 Aim for the Ace! 2 – Reika Ryuuzaki
 1988 Legend of the Galactic Heroes – Frederica Greenhill
 1988 Crying Freeman – Bugnug
 1989 Aim for the Ace! Final Stage – Reika Ryuuzaki
 1989 Crusher Joe – Major Tanya
 1989 Cleopatra DC – Strange Woman
 1990 Cyber City Oedo 808 – Sarah
 1990 Guardian of Darkness – Sayoo(m)ko Matsura
 1990 SD Gundam Gaiden – Sorceress Qubeley
 1990 Patlabor The Mobile Police: The New Files – Shinobu Nagumo
 1990 Record of Lodoss War – Karla
 1990 CB Chara Nagai Go World – Sirene
 1991 RG Veda – Karura-Ō
 1991 Bubblegum Crash – Sylia Stingray
 1991 Condition Green – Paula
 1991 Super Deformed Double Feature – Sylia Stingray
 1991 Moonlight's Earring – Takao Reseinji
 1991 Ninja Gaiden – Sara
 1993 Super Dimension Century Orguss 02 – Miran
 1994 Tenchi Muyo! Ryo-Ohki – Misaki
 1995 Golden Boy – Kogure’s girlfriend
 1996 The Special Duty Combat Unit Shinesman – Kyoko Sakakibara
 1996 Power DoLLS – Deborah Hughes
 1996 Mobile Suit Gundam: The 08th MS Team – Topp
 1996 Blue Seed Beyond – Azusa Matsudaira
 1999 Sol Bianca: The Legacy – Feb Fall
 2001 Zone of the Enders: 2167 Idolo – Rachel Links
 2003 Moeyo Ken – Oryo
 2006 Hellsing Ultimate – Sir Integra Fairbrook Wingates Hellsing
 2008 Cobra the Animation: The Psychogun – Armaroid Lady
 2009 Cobra the Space Pirate: Time Drive – Armaroid Lady
 2011 Supernatural: The Animation – Mysterious Beautiful Lady

Film
 1982 Space Adventure Cobra – Armaroid Lady
 1983 Urusei Yatsura: Only You – Elle
 1984 Nausicaä of the Valley of the Wind – Lady Kushana
 1987 Bats & Terry – Aya
 1988 Maison Ikkoku: The Final Chapter – Kuroki
 1988 Mami The Esper: Dancing Doll of the Starry Sky – Mama
 1988 Mobile Suit Gundam: Char's Counterattack – Nanai Miguel
 1989 Patlabor: The Movie – Shinobu Nagumo
 1990 Go! Anpanman: Baikinman no Gyakushuu – Tekka no Makichan
 1993 Patlabor 2: The Movie – Shinobu Nagumo
 1999 You're Under Arrest: The Movie – Kaoruko Kinoshita
 1999 Digimon Adventure – Yuuko Yagami
 2000 Blue Remains – Myazamik
 2000 The Mini Pato – Shinobu Nagumo
 2004 Ghost in the Shell 2: Innocence – Harraway
 2004 Mobile Suit Zeta Gundam: A New Translation – Haman Khan
 2005 Detective Conan: Strategy Above the Depths – Minako Akiyoshi
 2006 Ghost in the Shell: Stand Alone Complex - Solid State Society – Yoko Kayabuki
 2008 Ghost in the Shell 2.0 – Puppet Master
 2008 The Sky Crawlers – Towa Sasakura
 2009 Psalms of Planets Eureka Seven: Pocket Full of Rainbows – Old Anemone
 2015 Harmony – Oscar Shtaufenberg
 2015 Psycho-Pass: The Movie – Joshu Kasei

Video games
 1998 Sakura Wars 2: Thou Shalt Not Die – Carino Soletta
 2002 Space Channel 5: Part 2 – Pine
 2002 Tales of Destiny 2 – Elrane
 2006 Final Fantasy XII – Jote
 2007 ASH: Archaic Sealed Heat – Aceshin XV
 2012 Zero Escape: Virtue's Last Reward – Old Woman
 2016 Overwatch – Ana Amari
 2017 Fire Emblem Echoes: Shadows of Valentia – Mila
 2020 Fire Emblem Heroes – Mila

Dubbing

Live-action

 Annette Bening
 Captain Marvel – Supreme Intelligence and Dr. Wendy Lawson / Mar-Vell
 Death on the Nile – Euphemia
 Love Affair – Terry McKay
 Patricia Clarkson
 Learning to Drive – Wendy ShieldsThe Maze Runner – Ava PaigeMaze Runner: The Death Cure – Ava PaigeMaze Runner: The Scorch Trials – Ava Paige
Connie NielsenJustice League – HippolytaWonder Woman – HippolytaWonder Woman 1984 – HippolytaZack Snyder's Justice League – HippolytaThe 100 – Dr. Abigail "Abby" Griffin (Paige Turco)Airplane! (1983 TBS edition) – Randy (Lorna Patterson)Alien (1992 VHS/DVD edition) – Joan Lambert (Veronica Cartwright)The Basketball Diaries – Mrs. Carroll (Lorraine Bracco)Clarice – Ruth Martin (Jayne Atkinson)Coogan's Bluff (1984 Nippon TV edition) – Linny Raven (Tisha Sterling)Crocodile Dundee (1990 Fuji TV edition) – Sue Charlton (Linda Kozlowski)Crocodile Dundee II (1991 Fuji TV edition) – Sue Charlton (Linda Kozlowski)The Elephant Man (1982 TBS edition) – Ann Treves (Hannah Gordon)ER – Elizabeth Corday (Alex Kingston)The Final Countdown (1989 TBS edition) – Laurel Scott (Katharine Ross)Friday the 13th Part 2 – Ginny Field (Amy Steel)Heaven's Gate (1988 TBS edition) – Ella Watson (Isabelle Huppert)The Man with the Golden Gun (1982 TBS edition) – Saida (Carmen du Sautoy)No Man's Land (1991 TV Asahi edition) – Ann Varrick (Lara Harris)Octopussy (1988 TBS edition) – Magda (Kristina Wayborn)Over the Top (1989 Fuji TV edition) – Christina Hawk (Susan Blakely)Phenomena (2020 Blu-ray edition) – Frau Brückner (Daria Nicolodi)Piranha (1982 TBS edition) – Laura Dickinson (Melody Thomas Scott)Police Story (1987 Fuji TV edition) – Selina Fong (Brigitte Lin)Project A Part II (1989 Fuji TV edition) – Miss Pak (Rosamund Kwan)Romeo and Juliet (1982 TV Asahi edition) – Juliet (Olivia Hussey)The Spy Who Loved Me (1983 TBS edition) – Log Cabin Girl (Sue Vanner)To Kill with Intrigue (1986 TBS edition) – Chin Chin (Jeong Hee)Year of the Dragon (1988 TBS edition) – Tracy Tzu (Ariane Koizumi)Zombi 2 (1982 TBS edition) – Susan Barrett (Auretta Gay)

AnimationLegend of the Guardians: The Owls of Ga'Hoole'' – Nyra

Awards

References

External links
Official agency profile 
Yoshiko Sakakibara at GamePlaza-Haruka Voice Acting Database 
Yoshiko Sakakibara at Hitoshi Doi's Seiyuu Database

1956 births
Living people
Japanese video game actresses
Japanese voice actresses
Voice actresses from Chiba Prefecture
Voice actresses from Tokyo
20th-century Japanese actresses
21st-century Japanese actresses